La Rambla is a municipality in the province of Córdoba, Spain.

August 2021 National temperature record 
On August 14, 2021, the weather measurement station of La Rambla (AEMET) recorded an air temperature of 47.6°C (117.7°F), setting a new national-wide record for temperature high in Spain.

Notable people
Alfonso Cabello, a paralympic cyclist,  was born here in 1993.
Alejandro Lerroux (4 March 1864 – Madrid, 25 June 1949) was a Spanish politician who was the leader of the Radical Republican Party during the Second Spanish Republic.

References

Municipalities in the Province of Córdoba (Spain)